The 2023 Toyota U.S. Figure Skating Championships was held January 23–29, 2023, at the SAP Center in San Jose, California. Medals were awarded in the disciplines of men's singles, women's singles, pairs, and ice dance at the senior and junior levels. The results were part of the U.S. selection criteria for the 2023 World Championships, 2023 World Junior Championships, the 2023 Four Continents Championship, and the 2023 World Team Trophy.

San Jose was originally scheduled to host the 2021 event, but it was relocated to Las Vegas. San Jose was then awarded the 2023 Championships instead. It was the fourth time the city hosted the event.

Qualifying 
Skaters qualify for Nationals by competing in the National Qualifying Series, a series of competitions that allow skaters to qualify for the Sectionals, U.S. Pairs Final and U.S. Ice Dance Final in November.

Advancement to Nationals 
Skaters advance to Nationals by either having a bye or competing at Sectionals Singles, U.S. Pairs or U.S. Ice Dance Finals.

If the maximum number of competitors isn't reached through byes, additional spots will be available at the Championship Series. Competitors from the Championship Series will be selected on the next best total combined score. If the number of athletes with three international competitions from the approved competition list exceeds the number of available byes (4 for senior singles, 3 for senior pairs, and 5 for senior ice dance, 3 for all junior disciplines), byes will be awarded based on highest to lowest total score in the following order of importance:
 ISU Grand Prix of Figure Skating
 ISU Junior Grand Prix
 ISU Challenger Series

There will be a minimum required score for all athletes to compete to be decided in the fall of 2022. Approved international competitions applicable for byes are the Grand Prix Series, Junior Grand Prix Series, Challenger Series, and Junior and Senior Grand Prix Final.

Seniors

Singles 
Singles skaters can advance to Nationals in the following ways:
 Top 5 finish at the 2021 Toyota U.S. Figure Skating Championships 
 2022 U.S. Figure Skating World Team Members (not including alternates)
 Athletes who have won a medal in the singles event at the most recent Olympic Winter Games 
 Qualifying for the same event at the ISU Grand Prix of Figure Skating Final or the ISU Junior Grand Prix of Figure Skating Final
 Athletes who are assigned to and compete at three international assignments classified as an ISU Grand Prix, ISU Junior Grand Prix, and or ISU Challenger Series event
 The top two total combined scores from each section in the Sectional Singles Final
 Plus, next-best scores nationwide until the maximum is met

There will be a maximum of 18 spots.

Pairs 
Pairs can advance to Nationals in the following ways:
 Top 5 finish at the 2021 Toyota U.S. Figure Skating
 2021 U.S. Figure Skating World Team Members (not including alternates)
 Medalists in the pairs event at the most recent Olympic Winter Games
 Qualifying for the same event at the ISU Grand Prix of Figure Skating Final or the ISU Junior Grand Prix of Figure Skating Final
 Athletes who are assigned to and compete at three international assignments classified as an ISU Grand Prix, ISU Junior Grand Prix, and or ISU Challenger Series event
 The top four scores from the nation in the U.S. Pairs Final
 Plus, next-best scores at the U.S. Pairs Final until the maximum is met

There will be a maximum of 12 spots.

Ice dance 
Ice dance teams can advance to Nationals in the following ways:
 Top 5 finish at the 2021 Toyota U.S. Figure Skating
 2021 U.S. Figure Skating World Team Members (not including alternates)
 Medalists in the ice dance event at the most recent Olympic Winter Games
 Qualifying for the same event at the ISU Grand Prix of Figure Skating Final or the ISU Junior Grand Prix of Figure Skating Final
 Athletes who are assigned to and compete at three international assignments classified as an ISU Grand Prix, ISU Junior Grand Prix, and or ISU Challenger Series event
 The top five total combined scores from the nation in the U.S. Ice Dance Final
Plus, next-best scores at the U.S. Ice Dance Final until the maximum is met

There will be a maximum of 15 spots.

Juniors

Singles 
Singles skaters can advance to Nationals in the following ways:
 Qualifying for the same event at the ISU Junior Grand Prix of Figure Skating Final
 Athletes who are assigned to and compete at three international assignments classified as an ISU Junior Grand Prix, and or ISU Challenger Series event
 The top four total combined scores from each section in the Sectional Singles Final
 The top two total combined novice scores from each section in the Sectional Singles Final

There will be a maximum of 18 spots.

Pairs 
Pairs can advance to Nationals in the following ways:
 Qualifying for the same event at the ISU Junior Grand Prix of Figure Skating Final
 Athletes who are assigned to and compete at three international assignments classified as an ISU Junior Grand Prix, and or ISU Challenger Series event
 The top nine total combined scores from each section in the U.S. Pairs Final
 Plus, next-best teams from the U.S. Pairs Final until the maximum is met

There will be a maximum of 12 spots.

Ice dance 
Ice dance teams can advance to Nationals in the following ways:
 Qualifying for the same event at the ISU Junior Grand Prix of Figure Skating Final
 Athletes who are assigned to and compete at three international assignments classified as an ISU Junior Grand Prix, and or ISU Challenger Series event
 The top twelve total combined scores from each section in the U.S. Ice Dance Final
 Plus, the next-best teams from the U.S. Ice Dance Final until the maximum is met

There will be a maximum of 15 spots.

Entries 
U.S. Figure Skating published the official list of preliminary entries on November 21, 2022.

Senior

Junior

Changes to preliminary entries

Schedule

Medal summary

Senior

Junior

Senior results

Senior men

Senior women

Senior pairs

Senior ice dance

Junior results

Junior men

Junior women

Junior pairs

Junior ice dance

International team selections

Four Continents Championships 
The 2023 Four Continents Championships will be held from February 7–12, 2023 in Colorado Springs, Colorado in the United States. Teams will be selected using the Athlete Selection criteria.

World Junior Championships 
Commonly referred to as "Junior Worlds", the 2023 World Junior Championships will be held from February 27 – March 5, 2023, in Calgary, Canada. Teams will be selected using the Athlete Selection Criteria.

World Championships 
The 2023 World Championships will be held from March 20–26 in Saitama, Japan. Teams were selected using the Athlete Selection criteria.

References

External links 
 Official website

2023
Figure Skating Championships
2023 in sports in Tennessee
U.S. Championships
Sports competitions in San Jose, California